Villarcayo de Merindad de Castilla la Vieja is a municipality located in the province of Burgos, Castile and León, Spain. According to the 2004 census (INE), the municipality has a population of 4,031 inhabitants.

References

Municipalities in the Province of Burgos